Samuel Calvin (July 30, 1811 – March 12, 1890) was a Whig member of the U.S. House of Representatives from Pennsylvania.'''

Biography

Samuel Calvin was born in Washingtonville, Pennsylvania.  He attended the common schools and Milton Academy.  He taught in Huntingdon Academy, studied law, was admitted to the bar in 1836 and commenced practice in Hollidaysburg, Pennsylvania.

Calvin was elected as a Whig to the Thirty-first Congress.  He declined to be a candidate for renomination in 1850.  He resumed the practice of law and served as director of the Hollidaysburg School Board for thirty years.  He was a member of the State revenue board and a member of the State constitutional convention in 1873.  He died in Hollidaysburg in 1890 and was buried in Zion Lutheran Cemetery (not in the Presbyterian Cemetery as previously thought although a grandson of the same name is buried there). A Fall 1961 Bulletin of the Blair County Historical Society republished an article by Dr. Harry T. Coffey (written May 1, 1896) about the early days of the town and the leading men of Hollidaysburg:

"Among the young lawyers and business men who afterwards became prominent in public affairs were such men as David R. Porter, afterwards governor; James M. Bell, A. Porter Wilson and Samuel Calvin, (then a schoolteacher in Huntingdon).

"...I remember distinctly seeing as they came out in weekly parts, in green paper covers the first issues of Dicken's (then called "Boz") "Pickwick Papers."  Lying on the counter and hearing Samuel Calvin reading aloud to some friends who might be with him, the doings of the immortal Pickwick... No man was ever born better fitted to interpret Dickens, (Himself scarcely excepted) than Samuel Calvin. Himself for many years an accomplished principal, well versed in rhetoric and elocution and an orator of no little ability: a man whose able speeches on the subject of the tariff made him prominent as the whig (sic) candidate for governor in after years; a man who had much of the gentleness, amiability and good nature, without any of the weakness of Pickwick.

"Mr. Calvin, who must have removed from Huntingdon very soon after my father, was a frequent visitor at our house. He had a wide knowledge of classical literature, was a fine conversationalist, and I am indebted to him for some of the finest quotations from them, I can now recall, and also in developing my taste in the matter of reading only the best authors, especially English, whom he seems to have at his fingerends."

Samuel Calvin married Rebecca Blodget in the early 1840s and produced a daughter, Eliza in 1845, and a son, Mathew, in 1847.  Mathew followed his father's example and became a lawyer.

Descendants of Samuel Calvin live in several states; Virginia, Maryland, Florida, and Pennsylvania.

Sources

The Political Graveyard

1811 births
1890 deaths
Pennsylvania lawyers
American Presbyterians
Milton Academy alumni
People from Montour County, Pennsylvania
Whig Party members of the United States House of Representatives from Pennsylvania
19th-century American politicians
19th-century American lawyers